Mycoleptodonoides is a genus of tooth fungi in the family Meruliaceae. The genus was circumscribed by M.I. Nikolajeva in 1952 with M. vassiljevae, described from Ussuri, Russia, as the type species. This fungus, known only from the type locality and northern China, is little known. The more widely distributed  M. aitchisonii is found in habitats ranging from subtropical to boreal. The generic name combines the name Mycoleptodon and the Greek root -oides, meaning "resembling".

Description
Mycoleptodonoides species have fruitbodies with caps with "teeth" on the underside. It has a monomitic hyphal system with generative hyphae containing clamp connections. Spores are small and smooth, and non-reactive with Melzer's reagent (non-amyloid).

Species
Mycoleptodonoides aitchisonii (Berk.) Maas Geest. (1961) – India
Mycoleptodonoides pergamenea (Yasuda) Aoshima & H.Furuk. (1966) – Japan
Mycoleptodonoides sharmae K.Das, Stalpers & Stielow (2013) – India
Mycoleptodonoides tropicalis H.S.Yuan & Y.C.Dai (2009) – China
Mycoleptodonoides vassiljevae Nikol. (1952) – Russia; northern China

References

Polyporales genera
Meruliaceae
Taxa described in 1952